Carpophilinae is a subfamily of beetles in the family Nitidulidae. There are at least 70 described species in Carpophilinae.

Genera
 Amphicrossus Erichson, 1843
 Aphenolia Reitter, 1884
 Carpophilus Stephens, 1830
 Caplothorax Kirejtshuk, 1997
 Epuraea Erichson, 1843
 Nitops Murray, 1864
 Urophorus Murray, 1864

References

 Bouchard, P., Y. Bousquet, A. Davies, M. Alonso-Zarazaga, J. Lawrence, C. Lyal, A. Newton, et al. (2011). "Family-group names in Coleoptera (Insecta)". ZooKeys, vol. 88, 1–972.
 Habeck, Dale H. / Arnett, Ross H. Jr., Michael C. Thomas, Paul E. Skelley, and J. H. Frank, eds. (2002). "Family 77. Nitidulidae Latreille 1802". American Beetles, vol. 2: Polyphaga: Scarabaeoidea through Curculionoidea, 311–315.
 Lawrence, J. F., and A. F. Newton Jr. / Pakaluk, James, and Stanislaw Adam Slipinski, eds. (1995). "Families and subfamilies of Coleoptera (with selected genera, notes, references and data on family-group names)". Biology, Phylogeny, and Classification of Coleoptera: Papers Celebrating the 80th Birthday of Roy A. Crowson, vol. 2, 779–1006.

Further reading

 NCBI Taxonomy Browser, Carpophilinae
 Arnett, R. H. Jr., M. C. Thomas, P. E. Skelley and J. H. Frank. (eds.). (21 June 2002). American Beetles, Volume II: Polyphaga: Scarabaeoidea through Curculionoidea. CRC Press LLC, Boca Raton, Florida .
 Arnett, Ross H. (2000). American Insects: A Handbook of the Insects of America North of Mexico. CRC Press.
 Richard E. White. (1983). Peterson Field Guides: Beetles. Houghton Mifflin Company.

Nitidulidae
Beetle subfamilies